Kamal Kamel Mohammed (born 8 June 1945) is an Egyptian basketball player. He competed in the men's tournament at the 1972 Summer Olympics.

References

External links
 

1945 births
Living people
Egyptian men's basketball players
1970 FIBA World Championship players
Olympic basketball players of Egypt
Basketball players at the 1972 Summer Olympics
Place of birth missing (living people)